Anthony Eric Delroy (born 1 January 1953) is a retired Australian radio presenter. Delroy hosted ABC Local Radio's late-night talkback show Nightlife from 1987 to 2016 when he retired.

Background and career
Delroy commenced working in news radio on Sydney station 2SM while completing his schooling. He joined the Australian Broadcasting Corporation and worked on-air in Bathurst while studying journalism. After a short stint in Launceston, Delroy was appointed news director of 2UE. In 1987, he joined 702 ABC Sydney and soon took over the Nightlife program, at a period when broadcasts used to end about midnight or 1:00 am. In 1990 the program went national and the ABC replaced the state-based late night programming with the national show, a mix of talkback, current affairs and light entertainment, the highlight for some being a 25-question quiz.

The show's success as ABC Local Radio's highest rating weekday program was bolstered by a team of experts who are featured every week to discuss such topics as motoring, literature, movies, American politics, finance, superannuation and travel destinations. In a minor 2010 incident, Delroy received an official reprimand after he used abusive language at a security guard who asked Delroy to remove his car from the space reserved for Maurice Newman, the chairman of the ABC.

Delroy has a cat named Barbara, who was mentioned during his broadcasts, along with his fondness for football and horse racing.

Delroy retired on 2 September 2016, after 26 years hosting Nightlife and 30 years with the ABC.

References

External links
Nightlife

Living people
Journalists from Sydney
ABC radio (Australia) journalists and presenters
1953 births